Regierungsbezirk Liegnitz was an administrative region in the Prussian Province of Silesia and later Lower Silesia. It existed from 1815 to 1945 and covered the north-western part of Silesia. The administrative region of Liegnitz became known colloquially as Lower Silesia.

History 
In 1815, the districts of Bunzlau, Freystadt, Glogau, Goldberg, Grünberg, Liegnitz, Löwenberg, Lüben, Sagan and Sprottau as well as the lands of Prussian Upper Lusatia with the exception of Hoyerswerda were incorporated into the Liegnitz administrative region.

In 1816, the three new districts of Görlitz, Lauban and Rothenburg were established in Upper Lusatia. In 1820, the administrative region was enlarged to include the districts of Bolkenhain, Hirschberg, Jauer, Landeshut and Schönau from the dissolved Reichenbach administrative region and in 1825, the district of Hoyerswerda was transferred from the Province of Brandenburg to the administrative region of Liegnitz. The administrative seat was in the city of Liegnitz. Other important cities in the administrative region were Görlitz, Grünberg, Glogau, Bunzlau, Hoyerswerda (since 1825) and Hirschberg.

Regierungsbezirk Liegnitz bordered Regierungsbezirk Breslau to the east. In the northeast, it bordered the Province of Posen (from 1919, Poland), in the northwest, the Province of Brandenburg, in the west, Saxony and in the south, the Austrian crown land of Bohemia (from 1919, Czechoslovakia). From 1919 to 1938 and from 1941 to 1945, Silesia was divided into two provinces. At this time, the administrative region of Liegnitz belonged to the Province of Lower Silesia.

Administrative divisions 
The administrative region comprised the following urban and rural districts:

References 

1945 disestablishments
1815 establishments
Legnica
History of Silesia
Government regions of Prussia